Peru just entered the World Group in 2007, after winning the tie against Belarus. In 2008, his debut in the World Group of Cup Davis, was against Spain. It was 5-0 for the Spanish team and Peru just returned to the Zone groups.

Players

Peru